The 1932 New Mexico Lobos football team represented the University of New Mexico as a member of the Border Conference during the 1932 college football season. In their second season under head coach Chuck Riley, the Lobos compiled an overall record of 1–6–1 record with a mark of 1–3–1 against conference opponents, finished last out of six teams in the Border Conference, and were outscored by a total of 191 to 31. Orie McGuire was the team captain.

Schedule

References

New Mexico
New Mexico Lobos football seasons
New Mexico Lobos football